KSJL may refer to:

 KPLS-FM, a radio station (97.7 FM) licensed to serve Strasburg, Colorado, United States, which held the call sign KSJL from 2007 to 2019
 KYTY, a radio station (810 AM) licensed to serve Somerset, Texas, United States, which held the call sign KSJL from 1998 to 2007
 KXXM, a radio station (96.1 FM) licensed to serve San Antonio, Texas, which held the call sign KSJL-FM from 1993 to 1998
KTKR/760, which used the callsign KSJL from 1982 (when it was a construction permit) to 1993.